María Fernanda García (born September 17, 1967) is a Mexican actress best known as "Licha" in Una familia de diez. She has also appeared in many telenovelas and won a Silver Ariel for "Best Actress in a Minor Role" for the film Bienvenido — Welcome (1995) at the 37th Ariel Awards.

Filmography 
 Como tú no hay 2 (2020) - Amelia Campos de Orozco "La Pastora"
 Rubí (2020) - Rosa Emilia Ortiz de la Fuente
 Sin tu mirada (2018) - Soledad
 La Piloto (2017) - Estella Lesmes Vda. de Cadena y Vda. de Calle
 Un refugio para el amor (2012)
 Ni contigo ni sin ti (2011) - Cristina Gardel Mondragón
 Verano de amor (2009) - Reyna Olmos
 Lola, Érase Una Vez (2007)
 Las dos caras de Ana (2006-2007) - Cristina Durán de Gardel 
 Rebelde (2004-2006) - Alicia Salazar
 Rubí (2004) - Valeria
 Amarte es mi pecado (2004)
 Clase 406 (2002-2003) - Marlen Rivera
 Amigos x siempre (2000)
 Al norte del corazón (1997) - Beatriz
 Te dejaré de amar (1996) - Ligia
 Sueño de amor (1993) - Ligia Escalante
 Ángeles blancos (1990)
 Cuando llega el amor (1990)
 Luz y sombra (1989)
 Rosa salvaje (1987)

References

External links

Living people
20th-century Mexican actresses
21st-century Mexican actresses
Mexican film actresses
Mexican telenovela actresses
Mexican television actresses
Place of birth missing (living people)
1967 births